Arian creeds are the creeds of Arian Christians, developed mostly in the fourth century when Arianism was one of the main varieties of Christianity. A creed is a brief summary of the beliefs formulated by a group of religious practitioners, expressed in a more or less standardized format.  Arian creeds are a subset of Christian Creeds.

Christian creeds originate in the genres of the trinitarian formula and the Christological confession. In the mid-2nd century a type of doctrinal formula called the Rule of Faith emerged. These were seen as demonstrating the correctness of one's beliefs and helping to avoid heretical doctrines. In the third century, more elaborate professions of faith developed combining the influence of baptismal creeds (i.e., trinitarian formulae) and rules of faith. Learning the creeds was part of the process of gaining admission to the Christian religion. Interrogatory creeds were varieties of creeds used to test candidates for baptism, while declaratory creeds allowed the candidate to express their beliefs in the first person. Among the oldest known Christian Creeds are the Roman Creed and the Nicene Creed.

Most Arian creeds were written in the fourth century after 325 and during the Arian controversy - a time when the church adopted replacements for the Nicene Creed; in particular, for the word homoousios, as contained in the creed. The Arian controversy began with a dispute between bishop Alexander of Alexandria and a local presbyter, Arius, in the late 310s and early 320s. It lasted until Emperor Theodosius issued the Edict of Thessalonica in the year 380, in which he instructed the church to "believe in the one deity of the Father, the Son and the Holy Spirit, in equal majesty and in a holy Trinity." The edict continued to describe Christians who do not accept this teaching as "foolish madmen" and as "heretics." And, "they will suffer in the first place the chastisement of the divine condemnation and in the second the punishment of our authority which in accordance with the will of Heaven we shall decide to inflict." This was followed by proclamation of the Creed of Constantinople in 381.

The Council of Nicaea expressed its opposition to Arius' beliefs in the Nicene Creed. During the 55 years after Nicaea, there was a strong reaction in the church to the Nicene Creed; particularly to the word Greek homoousios ("same substance"). Consequently the church, during that period, formulated various creeds which offered alternatives to the word homoousios and which are regarded today as Arian creeds. Advocates of Nicene Christianity and Arian Christianity debated and competed throughout the fourth century, each claiming to be the orthodox variant. Nicene Christians called their opponents, as a group, Arians. However, many opponents of the Nicene Creed differed significantly from the teachings of Arius, and did not identify with Arius.

After Nicaea in 325, the Emperor Constantine gave orders that all of Arius' books be destroyed and that all people who hide Arius' writings, be killed. Therefore, very little of Arius' writings remains today. A brief statement of what Arius believed was preserved in a letter he wrote to the Arian archbishop of Constantinople; Eusebius of Nicomedia (died 341).

The church produced many more creeds after the Homoian group came to dominance in the church in the 350s. These include the Second Sirmian Creed (357), the Creed of Nike (360), the Creed of Acacius (359), the Rule of Faith and the Creed of Ulfilas (383), Eudoxius' Rule of Faith, the Creed of Auxentius (364), and the Creed of Germinius.

The Profession of Faith of Arius
Arius was a presbyter of Alexandria in the early fourth century. His teachings emphasized the differences between God the Father and the Son of God, in contrast to other churches that emphasized the divinity of the Son. Arius entered into conflict with his bishop, Alexander. Alexander excommunicated Arius in about 318. In a letter to his friend Eusebius of Nicomedia, Arius stated that he was being excommunicated for teaching that "the Son has an origin, but God is unoriginated ... and also that the Son derives from non-existence." Arius stated that he taught these things because the Son was not a part (μέρος) of the Father, nor an emanation or exhalation of the substance of the Father. For his part, Alexander stated that Arius' beliefs were as follows: There was a time when God was not Father, and the Son was created out of nothing. The Son is a created product and is not like in substance to the Father. He has come into existence whereas the Father has no origin. The Son is mutable and alterable while the Father is not. The Father is invisible to the Son. The Father created the Son in order to create humans. The father and the son are not consubstantial. Arius also argued that the word homoousios (consubstantial, or having the same substance) should not be used to describe the relation between God the Father and God the Son: Father and Son are not consubstantial according to Arius.Initially, Arius gained a great deal of support from other bishops in the Eastern Roman Empire. His early supporters included Eusebius of Nicomedia, Asterius, Athanasius of Anazarbus, Theognis of Nicaea, George of Laodicea, Paulinus of Tyre, and Eusebius of Caesarea. In about the year 320, Arius and his supporters wrote a letter to Alexander of Alexandria setting out their beliefs in the hope of getting Arius' excommunication rescinded. The letter contained a profession of faith, the earliest known Arian creed.

In an attempt to resolve the doctrinal controversy between the followers of Arius and of Alexander, Emperor Constantine called of the Council of Nicaea in 325. The council of Nicaea produced the Nicene Creed, which backed the doctrines of Alexander against those of Arius. Where Arius had declared that the Father and Son should not be considered consubstantial (homoousios), the Nicene Creed specifically declared the Father and Son to be consubstantial by declaring that the Son was of the substance of the Father (ἐκ τῆς οὐσίας τῆς πατρός). The Arian controversy persisted for the next sixty years, centering on the use of the term substance (ousia) to describe the relation between Father and Son in Christian theology, but extending to many related aspects of Christian theology such as the Incarnation and the Holy Spirit.

The Dedication Creed
Although the Nicene Creed had backing from a large council of bishops (the Council of Nicaea), and the support of Emperor Constantine I, many bishops, especially in the East, were not comfortable with its doctrine. In particular, the term homoousios, or 'consubstantial', troubled many bishops, firstly because, they stated, it was not to be found in the Scriptures; and second because it could imply that the Son was a piece of the Father, or even that the Son was indistinguishable from the Father, beliefs that were considered Sabellian and therefore heretical. This widespread opposition to the Nicene Creed meant that Arius and the Arians enjoyed widespread sympathy and support. But at the same time as they resisted the Nicene Creed and sympathized with Arius, many Eastern bishops were not convinced that Arius' theology was entirely correct. Eusebius of Nicomedia, in particular, took vigorous measures to reduce the influence of pro-Nicene bishops and enhance the influence of those opposed to the Nicene Creed. However, the creed proposed by this group was, though anti-Nicene, not entirely Arian, as were these bishops themselves.

In 341, approximately 90 bishops met in a Council of Antioch, formally presided over by bishop Flacillus of Antioch. Officially, the bishops were meeting to celebrate the dedication of a new church built by Constantius II. Because of this, the creed produced at the Council of Antioch is often known as the Dedication Creed. Four creeds were produced at the same council; the Dedication Creed is also known as the Second Creed of Antioch.

The leaders of the Council of Antioch of 341 were Eusebius of Nicomedia, now bishop of Constantinople, and Acacius of Caesarea, who become bishop of Caesarea in 340. Aside from Flacillus of Antioch, other leading bishops present were Gregory of Alexandria, George of Laodicea, Eudoxius of Germanicia, Patrophilus of Scythopolis, Theodore of Heraclea, Narcissus of Neronias, Dianius of Cappadocian Caesarea, and Asterius. In the First Creed of Antioch, these bishops made clear that they were not following Arius, but rather investigating or judging him. Their goal was thus not to produce an Arian creed, but rather a creed that criticized the use of homoousios, but also reflected concerns with Arian doctrine. The resultant Dedication Creed was anti-Nicene rather than pro-Arian.

Some authors consider the Dedication Creed to be Arian or friendly to Arianism. Gwatkin argued that the Dedication Creed was written in such a way as to allow Arians within its broad scope, and that many Arians accepted and reproduced it; to Gwatkin it was, if not Arian, "Arianizing." Simonetti also argued that the Dedication Creed was specifically written to be acceptable to Arians. Boularand called the Dedication Creed "crypto-Arian." However, several of the statements in the Dedication Creed directly or indirectly contradicted Arian beliefs, so that other authors have considered the Dedication Creed anti-Arian, including Schwartz and Klein. Of ancient authors, Hilary considered it orthodox while Athanasius considered it Arian.

According to Hanson, at least two statements in the Dedication Creed would have been difficult for Arians to accept: (1) The Dedication Creed stated that the Son is an image of the substance of the Father, using the term ousia for 'substance', but Arians had rejected the use of the term ousia as not being found in the Scriptures.

(2) In addition, Arians believed that the Son was begotten, but the Dedication Creed stated that there was no "time or occasion or age exists or did exist before the Son was begotten," implying the immanence of the Son in the Godhead, an idea the Arians rejected. On the other hand, the statement that the Son 'was not a creature like the other creatures' was familiar to Arians, and could be taken to accept the Arian belief that the Son was a creature of God, though a special and unique creature. Furthermore, the Dedication Creed graded and ranked Father, Son, and Holy Spirit in the way preferred by Arians. Hanson, however, argues that 'subordinationism,' or the belief that the members of the Trinity should be ranked and that the Son was subordinate to the Father, was very common in the Eastern church at the time, and that the subordinationism of the Dedication Creed reflects such a generalized Eastern belief, rather than being a specifically Arian doctrine.

These bishops drew up the Dedication Creed "in order to counter what were thought to be the dangerous tendencies of" the Nicene Creed, in particular, Sabellianism, namely, "the denial of a distinction between the three within the Godhead." They thought that the Nicene Creed, by asserting consubstantiality and denying separate beings (hypostases) to the Father, Son, and Holy Spirit, left the door open to Sabellianism. They designed the Dedication Creed to shut that door.

The phrases 'God from God,' 'whole from whole', and similar ones in the Dedication Creed were intended to deny the idea that the Son was a piece of the father that had been broken off or separated. Arians rejected the idea of the Son as a piece of the Father, so this is another sense in which the Dedication Creed was friendly to Arians. However, Hanson considers the rejection of the idea of the Son as a piece of the Father to be an Origenist doctrine rather than specifically an Arian one. The distinction of hypostases within the Godhead is also reminiscent of Origen, so that the Dedication Creed can be considered 'Origenist.' Hanson also finds a possible influence of Asterius in the terminology of hypostases 'agreeing' (συμφωνίαν), a phrase found in the known fragments of Asterius.

The Dedication Creed was intended to replace the Nicene Creed. The Dedication Creed excluded the kind of Arianism originally proposed by and associated with Arius himself. Because of this, Simonetti believes that by 341, Eusebius of Nicomedia had shifted his views from his earlier support of Arius. On the other hand, the Dedication Creed resembled the doctrines taught by Eusebius of Caesarea prior to the Arian controversy. Thus, Hanson concludes that the intellectual ancestors of the Dedication Creed are Origen, Asterius, and Eusebius of Caesarea.

The Second Sirmian Creed
In the 350s Constantius II became sole Emperor of the Roman Empire. Constantius generally favored Arians over Nicenes and encouraged the calling of councils to resolve doctrinal disputes. A council was held in Sirmium, which was Constantius' main capital city, in 357. Attendants at the Third Council of Sirmium in 357 included Germinius of Sirmium, Valens of Mursa, Ursacius of Singidunum, Potamius of Lisbon, and Hosius of Corduba. Hanson also cites evidence that Mark of Arethusa and George of Alexandria were in attendance. The Council of Sirmium produced the creed known as the Second Sirmian Creed. The most likely authorship is by Valens, Ursacius, and Germinius, who are all well known advocates of Arian beliefs. Hilary of Poitiers attributed authorship to Hosius, but this is unlikely because Hosius had been an author and advocate of the Nicene Creed. Instead, Hosius may have been coerced by Constantius into signing the Sirmian Creed. This creed marks the emergence of the Homoian Arians as a visible movement within Arianism.

The Second Sirmian Creed was written in Latin and is preserved in the writings of Hilary of Poitiers.

The Second Sirmian Creed aroused strong opposition from pro-Nicene theologians; Hilary of Poitiers called it the Blasphemy of Sirmium and Ossius' lunacy.

The Second Sirmian Creed avoids the following beliefs characteristic of Arius' own beliefs: it does not discuss the relation of Son to Logos, it does not say that the Son was produced out of nothing, and it does not state that the Son is created, using instead terms translatable as begotten and born. However it is Arian in subordinating the Son to the Father, insisting on a unique status for the Father, rejecting the concept of substance (ousia), and asserting that the Son suffered by means of his body (reflecting the Arian belief that God the Father did not suffer). The Second Dedication Creed does not follow the Eunomian Arianism. It represents instead the Arians known as Homoian, who had broken with some of Arius' beliefs and refused to accept Eunomius'.

The Creed of Nike
In 359, Constantius II called a small council of leading bishops in Sirmium to produce a document that, he hoped, would be signed by bishops on opposing sides of the Arian controversy, bringing an end to the conflict. Constantius brought together advocates of the Homoiousian position and of the Homoian Arian position, while excluding the extremes on either side of the controversy, represented by the supporters of Athanasius on the Nicene side and the Eunomians on the Arian side. This Fifth Council of Sirmium produced a creed called the Dated Creed, which itself served as the basis for the Creed of Nike.

The Homoiousians had emerged only a year before, at the Council of Ancyra of 358. This council was called by Basil of Ancyra to discuss allegations made by George of Laodicea that the bishop of Antioch was encouraging extreme Arian positions such as Eunomianism, and specifically the doctrine that the Father and Son are unlike in substance. The Council of Ancyra of 358 included bishops Basil of Ancyra, Macedonius of Constantinople, Eugenius of Nicaea, and Eustathius of Sebaste. George of Laodicea was a signatory to the statement it produced though not present.

The position taken at the Council of Ancyra has often been called Semi-Arianism, but today is more often called Homoiousian theology. Hanson emphasizes that this group, centered on Basil of Ancyra, did not use the word homoiousian themselves. Their formula was that the Father and Son are 'like in ousia' (ὅμοιος κατ' οὐσίαν). They argued that while it was possible to state that the Father was creator (ktistes) and the Son, creature (ktisma), they were also Father and Son. Since all fathers beget sons that are like them in ousia, this must be so of the Father and Son. Therefore, to refer to the Father and Son without the notion of similar ousia is to reduce the relation to one of creator and creature. This group also opposed the idea of homoousios, or consubstantiality, for following their line of argumentation, Father and Son did not have the same but only like substance; assuming consubstantiality could reduce the Son to a part of the Father, or even suggest that Father and Son were in fact the same being, which was considered an approach to the Sabellian heresy.

Following the Council of Ancyra, Basil of Ancyra traveled to Sirmium with a delegation including Eustathius of Sebaste and Eleusius of Cyzicus. This delegation gained the approval of Constantius II, who declared his belief that the Son was like the Father in ousia (κατ'οὐσίαν ὅμοιος τῷ πατρί), the homoiousian position. A Fourth Council of Sirmium was called in which the homoiousians (Basil, Eustathius, and Eleusius) met with the Homoian Arians (Valens, Ursacius, and Germinius) along with some other bishops from North Africa. Since these groups appeared were able to work out common statements of belief, Constantius decided to call a larger council to try to end the Arian controversy. In preparation for this council, Constantius asked for a smaller council to meet to prepare a creed that attendants would be asked to assent to. This smaller preparatory council was the Fifth Council of Sirmium, held in 359.

Those present at the Fifth Council of Sirmium were Germinius of Sirmium, Valens of Mursa, and Ursacius of Singidunum, Basil of Ancyra, George of Alexandria, Pancratius of Pelusium, and Mark of Arethusa. According to Germinius, after a long night's discussion they agreed to accept the formula proposed by Mark of Arethusa, 'the Son like the Father in everything as the holy Scriptures declare and teach.' The creed was written by Mark of Arethusa and was precisely dated to 22 May 359. For this reason it is often called the Dated Creed instead of the Fourth Sirmian Creed.

Following the Fifth Council of Sirmium, Constantius II summoned Christian bishops to a general church council. To avoid conflict between Western and Eastern churches, he summoned the Eastern bishops to meet at Seleucia and the Western bishops at Ariminium. His intention was that both councils would discuss and approve the Dated Creed. At the Council of Seleucia approximately 150 bishops attended. The largest contingent was homoiousian, led by Eleusius of Cyzicus, George of Laodicea, and Silvanus of Tarsus. Basil of Ancyra, Macedonius of Constantinople, and Eustathius of Sebaste did not attend as other bishops had them under accusation for ecclesiastical misdemeanors. The Homoians were also in attendance, represented by Acacius of Caesarea, George of Alexandria, Uranius of Tyre, and Eudoxius of Antioch. The Eunomians were not present. The Council did not agree to sign the Dated Creed. Instead, Acacius submitted his own creed for consideration. This creed was not accepted by a majority, and the council eventually dissolved without coming to any agreement. The various groups at the Council sent representatives to Constantinople, where Constantius II was now in residence.

Meanwhile, Western bishops were meeting at the Council of Ariminum. 400 bishops assembled at the Council. The Homoian Arians were represented by Valens of Mursa, Ursacius of Singidunum, Germinius of Sirmium, Gaius and Demophilus. This group proposed the Dated Creed, but the assembled bishops rejected it and reaffirmed their adherence to the Nicene Creed. They sent ten bishops to meet with Constantius II at Constantinople, but the Emperor refused to see them and made them wait at Adrianople. Constantius them moved the entire council from Ariminum to a placed called Nike in Thrace. He them sent Valens of Mursa back to pressure the bishops to sign a version of the Dated Creed. The Western bishops, and especially Claudius of Picenum made Valens publicly anathematize a series of Arian beliefs, and publicly reject Arius and Arianism. A series of anathemas were added to the Dated Creed that watered down its sense so that it no longer appeared a truly Arian creed. The bishops then signed the creed and Constantius allowed them to return to their homes for the winter.

The homoiousian group from the Council of Seleucia, now in Constantinople, was finally convinced to sign a creed similar to the Dated Creed, on 31 December 359. The words 'in all respects' were eliminated after 'like the Father', so that the homoiousian formula 'like the Father in all respects', which had been in the Dated Creed, was not in the Creed of Nike. Further, two sentences were added: one of them argued that the Father, Son, and Holy Spirit should not be regarded as having one 'hypostasis', while the other one anathematized all beliefs opposed to this creed. The creed signed by the homoiousians on New Year's Eve, 359, and by the Council of Ariminum relocated to Nike, has been called Creed of Nike, but is also known as the Creed of Constantinople since some of the Eastern bishops signed in Constantinople. However it should not be confused with the more famous Creed of Constantinople of 381.

In 360, a follow-up council was held in Constantinople, the Council of Constantinople of 360. Acacius of Caesarea was now Constantius' main advisor, Basil of Ancyra having lost influence as the homoiousian formula 'like in all respects' had been unable to convince the bishops at the councils of Ariminum and Seleucia. The Council of Constantinople promulgated once again the Creed of Nike as it had been signed by the twin councils the year before. For a time, the Creed of Nike became the official orthodox creed, replacing the Nicene Creed. It also became the creed of most Arians. Homoian Arianism replaced the old ideas of Arius as the leading variant of Arianism, and also gained strength against the rival Arian variant of Eunomianism.

The Creed of Acacius
During the Council of Seleucia in 359, Acacius of Caesarea produced his own creed, which he hoped the assembled bishops would agree to.

Hanson describes the Creed of Acacius as "a wholly characterless, insignificant creed (though it may have represented the kind of doctrine which the Emperor at that time favoured)." The bishops assembled at Seleucia did not accept this creed. Instead, since Acacius had previously argued with Cyril of Jerusalem, the bishops at Seleucia decided to examine Acacius' accusations against Cyril. Since Acacius refused to submit to this examination, the bishops deposed him on paper. The imperial officials at the council, Leonas and Lauricius, broke up the council, and Acacius went directly to Constantinople to present his case to the Emperor Constantius II. Acacius was not adversely affected, and became the Emperor's main advisor on ecclesiastical affairs. The Homoian Arians remained the most powerful group until the death of Constantius in November 361.

The Rule of Faith of Ulfilas
Ulfilas was the Arian bishop of the Goths. According to Auxentius of Durostorum, he uttered the following Rule of Faith on his death-bed in Constantinople:

This Rule of Faith demonstrates one of the characteristics of Arian belief, the "drastic subordination of the Son".

The Creed of Ulfilas
Auxentius of Durostorum provided a formal statement of what Ulfilas, Arian bishop of the Goths, believed:

Eudoxius' Rule of Faith
Eudoxius of Antioch is sometimes considered a moderate Arian of the Homoian tendency, but was at times friendly to Aëtius and Eunomius, representatives of the Eunomian tendency. According to Hanson, "he made the transition from Eunomian to Homoian Arianism."

Hanson translates a section of Eudoxius' Rule of Faith that, he states, exemplifies the Arian belief concerning a suffering God. "It was a central part of Arian theology that God suffered" This is because Arians, in common with other Christians, believed that God had become incarnate in a human body. In Arian theology, God the Father begat God the Son, and God the Son was incarnated in a human body, where he was crucified and died in order to show humans the way to overcome death. However Arians also believed that God the Father was perfect and could not suffer. Thus suffering was transposed onto the Son, who experienced suffering when incarnate in a human body. Arians believed that the incarnate Son, Jesus Christ, had no human soul, because it was God occupying a human body. This doctrine went together with the doctrine that Jesus was not "mere human," because if he were mere human his death would not lead to salvation for humanity. Thus Jesus had to be God, Word, or Logos incarnate, and not mere human; and as such it was the God within that animated the flesh, not a human soul.

The Creed of Auxentius
In 364, Hilary of Poitiers tried to have Auxentius of Milan deposed for heresy. Hilary was a committed advocate of the Nicene Creed, while Auxentius was an Arian. Hilary and Eusebius of Vercelli reported Auxentius to the Emperor Valentinian I. Unlike Constantius II, Valentinian tried to remain neutral and avoid involvement in ecclesiastical affairs. The Emperor ordered an investigation of Auxentius' beliefs. In response, Auxentius wrote the following letter declaring his beliefs.

The letter convinced Valentinian I that Auxentius was no heretic. He dismissed the case and ordered Hilary back to Poitiers. Hilary wrote Contra Auxentium to describe the events. Hanson states that the creed of Auxentius is not representative of Homoian Arian doctrine, because Auxentius chose to defend himself by using traditional formulae passed down in the Milanese church since before the Arian controversy.

The Creed of Germinius
Germinius was the bishop of Sirmium and as such was present at the Councils of Sirmium. He was present at and involved in the drafting of the Dated Creed. In 365 he produced a creed called the Symbol of Germinius of Sirmium. 

This profession of faith caused concern among Homoian Arian bishops because Germinius said that the Son was like the Father 'in all things' (per omnia similem). This was the Homoiousian formula proposed by Basil of Ancyra and rejected at the Council of Seleucia. Valens of Mursa, Ursacius of Singidunum, Gaius, and Paulus met in a council at Singidunum in 366. They wrote a letter to Germinius asking him to say that the Son is like the Father 'according to the Scriptures' because 'in all respects' could be taken to accept homoousianism, that is, commonality of substance, which Arians consistently rejected. In response, Germinius produced the following creed.

According to Hanson, although Germinius was at one time a committed Homoian Arian, this creed is not Homoian Arian, but instead shows that by 366 Germinius had abandoned Homoian Arianism. Instead, this position is similar to that of the Second Creed of Antioch or Dedication Creed produced at the Council of Antioch of 341.

References

Bibliography
   
 
 
 

Arianism
Nature of Jesus Christ